On the Ropes is the debut album by British electronic music duo Mint Royale, released in 1999 on the Faith & Hope label.

In June 2001, a new version of the album was published for the U.S. market by MCA Records, featuring a different cover (with a close-up photo of a pinball machine) and a different track list. The two versions of "Shake Me" present in the original album were removed, and three new songs were added: two exclusive songs, as well as "Show Me", which would later appear in Mint Royale's subsequent album Dancehall Places (2002).

Track listing

UK version
All songs were written by Chris Baker and Neil Claxton, except where noted.
"From Rusholme with Love" (Baker, Claxton, John Mayer) – 5:08
"Don't Falter" featuring Lauren Laverne (Baker, Claxton, Laverne) – 4:12
"Interlude 1" – 0:37
"Take It Easy" – 3:49
"Because I'm Worth It" – 5:56
"Shake Me (Original)" (Baker, Claxton, Kenny Young) – 4:12
"Diagonal Girl" – 4:48
"Rock and Roll Bar" featuring Julia Baker – 4:35
"Space Farm" – 5:28
"Deadbeat" (Baker, Claxton, Cocker, Stainton) – 4:52
"Lonely Girl" featuring Debbie Newman (Baker, Claxton, Croft) – 4:24
"Interlude 2" – 0:43
"Shake Me (Vocal Edit)" (Baker, Claxton, Young) – 4:10

US Version
 "From Rusholme with Love" – 5:08
 "Don't Falter" featuring Lauren Laverne – 4:12
 "Show Me" featuring Pos – 3:43
 "Interlude 1" - 0:37
 "Because I'm Worth It" – 5:56
 "Take It Easy" – 3:49
 "Kenny's Last Dance" (U.S. exclusive) – 4:13
 "Trickshot" (U.S. exclusive) - 5:01
 "Diagonal Girl" – 4:48
 "Rock and Roll Bar" featuring Julia Baker – 4:19
 "Space Farm" – 5:28
 "Deadbeat" – 4:52
 "Interlude 2" – 0:43
 "Lonely Girl" – 4:24

Personnel

Mint Royale
Neil Claxton - production, keyboards, guitar, brass, organ, programming
Chris Baker – bass, production

Additional musicians
Julia Baker – vocals
Amul Batra – tabla
Dave Diamond – guitar
Gail Hebson – vocals
Lauren Laverne – vocals
Debbie Newman – vocals
Victor Smalls – drums & percussion
Richard Woolgar – guitar

References

1999 debut albums
Mint Royale albums